Salix eriocephala, known as heart-leaved willow or Missouri River willow, is a species of willow native to a large portion of the temperate United States and Canada.

It has dark gray, scaly bark with thick lance-shaped leaves that are hairy underneath. The silky catkins appear before the leaves in early spring.

References

External links
 
 
 

eriocephala
Flora of North America